The Globigerinina is a suborder of foraminiferans that are found as marine plankton.  They produce hyaline calcareous tests, and are known as fossils from the Jurassic period onwards.  The group has included more than 100 genera and over 400 species, of which about 30 species are extant.  One of the most important genera is Globigerina; vast areas of the ocean floor are covered with Globigerina ooze (named by Murray and Renard in 1873), dominated by the shells of planktonic forms.

Description
Globigerinids are characterized by distinctly perforate planispiral or trochospiral tests composed of lamellar radial hyaline (glassy) calcite, with typically globular chambers and single interiomarginal aperture. Some however have multiple or auxiliary apertures, and in some the aperture is areal or terminal in location. Some, also, have keels,  reinforcing thickenings along exterior angles. An adaptation to the planktonic habit is the development of long narrow spines that support a frothy buoyant ectoplasm.

Superfamilies and families
The Globigerinina are now divided into these superfamilies and families:

 superfamily Globigerinitoidea Bermúdez, 1961
 family Globigerinitidae Bermúdez, 1961
 superfamily Globigerinoidea Carpenter et al., 1862
 family Globigerinidae Carpenter & al., 1862
 family Hastigerinidae Bolli, Loeblich & Tappan, 1957
 superfamily Globorotalioidea Cushman, 1927
 family Candeinidae Cushman, 1927
 family Catapsydracidae Bolli & al., 1957 †
 family Eoglobigerinidae Blow, 1979 †
 family Globorotaliidae Cushman, 1927
 family Pulleniatinidae Cushman, 1927
 family Truncorotaloididae Loeblich & Tappan, 1961 †
 superfamily Globotruncanoidea Brotzen, 1942 †
 family Globotruncanidae Brotzen, 1942 †
 family Rugoglobigerinidae Subbotina, 1959 †
 superfamily Guembelitrioidea Montanaro Gallitelli, 1957
 family Cassigerinellidae Bolli & al., 1957 †
 family Chiloguembelinidae Reiss, 1963
 family Guembelitriidae Montanaro Gallitelli, 1957
 superfamily Hantkeninoidea Cushman, 1927
 family Hantkeninidae Cushman, 1927 †
 superfamily Heterohelicoidea Cushman, 1927
 family Heterohelicidae Cushman, 1927
 superfamily Planomalinoidea Bolli et al., 1957 †
 family Globigerinelloididae Longoria, 1974 †
 family Planomalinidae Bolli & al., 1957 †
 family Schackoinidae Pokorny, 1958 †
 superfamily Rotaliporoidea Sigal, 1958 †
 family Conoglobigerinidae Boudagher-Fadel et al., 1997 †
 family Favusellidae Michael, 1973 †
 family Globuligerinidae Loeblich & Tappan, 1984 †
 family Hedbergellidae Loeblich & Tappan, 1961 †
 family Praehedbergellidae Banner & Desai, 1988 †
 family Rotaliporidae Sigal, 1958 †
 family Sphaerogerinidae BouDagher-Fadel et al., 2012 †

References

 Chisholm, Hugh, ed. (1911). "Globigerina". Encyclopædia Britannica (11th ed.). Cambridge University Press
 Cushman Joseph A 1950  Foraminifera, their classification and economic use (4th ed)  Harvard University Press, Cambridge, Massachusetts
 Loeblich, A. R. Jr and H. Tappan, 1964. Sarcodina Chiefly "Thecamoebians" and Foraminiferida; Treatise on Invertebrate Paleontology, part C Protista 2.
___—, 1988. Classification of the Foraminifera
 Sen Gupta B. K. 1992. 	  Systematics of Modern Foraminifera

External links
 Protists and the Origin of Eukaryotes

 
Rotaliida